According to the last census from 2021, there were 67,179 persons counted as Romani people in Slovakia, or 1.23% of the population. However, the number of Roma is usually underreported, with estimates placing the Roma population at 7-11% of the population. Thus the actual number of Roma may be over half a million.

History

Migration to Slovakia

The first record of sightings of small groups of Romani within the area of present-day Slovakia are from 1322 AD, when the region was part of the Kingdom of Hungary. Major waves of Romani nomads were recorded from 1417 onwards. In 1423 they received a decree from the Hungarian king Sigismund of Luxemburg at Szepes Castle, granting them Europe-wide right of passage and the right to settle. They proved to be useful metal workers for the royal armies fighting the Turks.

Through the ensuing centuries, whilst in western and central Europe Romani were treated violently and often expelled, the Hungarian Kingdom and Habsburg Monarchy in general provided a tolerant and stable safe-haven for the Romani community. In the 18th century, Joseph II of the house of Habsburg attempted to 'civilize' the Romani, for example by prohibiting their dress and customs and educating them.  However these efforts generally failed.

20th century

After the repressive Romani policies of the first Czechoslovak Republic (1918-1939), the communist government of 1948-1989 attempted to integrate the Romani into the majority population through obligatory education and employment, and the formation of Romani organizations. The nomadic way of life was banned in 1958. Parts of the Romani population were also transferred from Slovakia into the country's Czech regions.

Though these policies were partly successful, after the 1989 Velvet Revolution, the Romani have once again found themselves on the margins of the society. On the one hand, there is a generous social system, but the system fails to effectively integrate them into the mainstream society.

Discrimination in education
Roma people suffer serious discrimination in Slovakia. Roma children are segregated in school and do not receive the same level of education as Slovak children. Some are sent to schools for children with mild mental disabilities. As a result, their attainment level is far below average. Amnesty International's report "Unfulfilled promises: Failing to end segregation of Roma pupils in Slovakia" describes the failure of the Slovak authorities to end the discrimination of Roma children on the grounds of their ethnicity in education. According to a 2012 United Nations Development Programme survey, around 43 per cent of Roma in mainstream schools attended ethnically segregated classes.

Forced sterilisation
A human rights fact finding mission found widespread violations of Romani women's human rights including forced sterilisations, racially discriminatory access to health care and physical and verbal abuse by medical staff amongst others. The report from 2003 states that there was a "clear and consistent patterns of health-care providers who disregarded the need for obtaining informed consent to sterilization and who failed to provide accurate and comprehensive reproductive health information to Romani patients."

The claim of forced sterilization is, however, often debated to be false, as the paper published by a Non-governmental organization "aimed at proving an earlier assumed hypothesis, highly popular in the media. It did not bring any specific knowledge, no hard data, thanks to which we could say that some truth was revealed. This is, to put it shortly, an example of a harmful action on the part of NGOs."

Crime
Roma are the victims of ethnically driven violence and crime in Slovakia. According to monitoring and reports provided by the European Roma Rights Center (ERRC) in 2013, racist violence, evictions, threats, and more subtle forms of discrimination have increased over the past two years in Slovakia. The ERRC considers the situation in Slovakia to be one of the worst in Europe, as of 2013.

Social help
Romani people receive new housing from municipalities and regional administrations for free every year, however people complain that some of them end up being destroyed by Romani people themselves. After the destruction, in some cases it has happened that the residents receive new housing, without being criminally prosecuted for destroying state property.

Public opinion
The 2019 Pew Research poll found that 76% of Slovaks held unfavorable views of Roma.

Notable Romani people living or born in the area of present-day Slovakia
 Vierka Berkyová, a singer (1991–)
 Irena Bihariová, human rights activist (1980–)
 Panna Cinka, a violinist (1711?–1772)
 Ondrej Rigo, a serial killer (1955–2022)
 Rytmus, a rapper (1977–)

See also
Romani people in Czechoslovakia
Demographics of Slovakia
Luník IX
Romani people in Romania

References

External links
 The largest archive of gypsy music on the Internet - 100,000 gypsy songs
 CNN: Slovakia seeks help on Roma issue
 Ultimate Exile: A Gypsy Poet Expelled by Her People The New York Times, January 8, 2007

 
Ethnic groups articles needing expert attention